The 2014 St Kilda Football Club season was the 118th in the club's history. Coached by Alan Richardson and captained by Nick Riewoldt, they competed in the AFL's 2014 Toyota Premiership Season.

Season summary

Pre-season

Regular season

Standings

References

External links
 
 Listing of St Kilda game results in 2014

St Kilda Football Club seasons